Presque Isle Lake is a  lake in the town of Presque Isle, in Vilas County, Wisconsin. It is a recreational lake with sport fishing. Native Americans also spearfish on the lake.

History
The lake is known for sport fishing muskellunge.

Chippewa Indians exercise their federally protected treaty rights to spearfish walleye on the lake. The activity draws protests from the local residents. The Lac De Flambeau Chippewa Indians were able to spear 449 Walleye from the lake in 1987.

See also
 List of lakes of Vilas County, Wisconsin
 List of lakes in Wisconsin
 Wisconsin Walleye War

References

Lakes of Vilas County, Wisconsin
Lakes of Wisconsin
Tourist attractions in Vilas County, Wisconsin